Present Music is a contemporary nonprofit music organization and 
ensemble based in Milwaukee, WI. It was founded in 1982, 
and is currently led by founder and Artistic Director Kevin Stalheim.
Present Music has put on shows in many venues around the world, but primarily performs in Milwaukee.

Background 

Present Music was founded in Milwaukee, Wisconsin by Kevin Stalheim in 1982. Since its inception, the organization has performed or commissioned composition of new music by living composers. Its music is considered to be 21st Century music, and is often polystylistic and eclectic, incorporating unique instrumentation and musical techniques. Present Music is nonprofit, and is supported by ticket sales, grants, and donations. Present Music also has an education program called the Creation Project.

Concerts 

Present Music puts on six or seven concerts every season, many of which operate around a central theme or idea. In addition to the musical aspects of the presentations, some of its concerts include an elaborate or immersive visual aspect as well, such as dance or video. As well as hosting many concerts in Milwaukee, Present Music has performed at festivals around the world. Notable Present Music appearances include:
The Bang on a Can music festival in New York
The Columbia University Composer Portraits Series in New York
The Interlink Festival of New American Music in Japan
The Istanbul International Music Festival in Turkey

Discography 

The Present Music Ensemble has been featured on several different CDs of some of the works that Present Music composers have written, including:
Flight Box (2001)
Haunted America (2002)
In White (2004)
Michael Torke: 6 (2005)
Henry Brandt Collection, Vol. 3 (2006)
Graffiti (2009)
Kamran Ince (2010)
Kamran Ince Passion and Dreams (2016)

Creation Project 

The Creation Project is a program in which Present Music teams one of their in-residence composers with a group of students ranging from little musical understanding to advanced. The composer works with the students over 10 weeks to teach them about melody, rhythm, and harmony, culminating in an original composition written by the students. The Creation Project is traditionally done with young people, but has been conducted with members of a senior center as well.

Composers in residence 

These are the past and present composers in residence for Present Music.
John Adams	
Timo Andres
Thomas Bloch	
Jeffrey Brooks
Ryan Carter
Christopher Cerrone	
Mary Ellen Childs	
Michael Daugherty
John Downey
Paul Dresher	
Alexandra du Bois
Sean Friar
Annie Gosfield	
Daron Hagen	
Kimmo Hakola
John Harbison	
Eleanor Hovda	
Kamran Ince
Ben Johnston
Molly Joyce	
Jerome Kitzke	
Guy Klucevsek
Joan La Barbara	
Mary Jane Lamond	
David Lang
Daniel Lentz	
Scott Lindroth	
Armando Luna
Tod Machover	
Wendy MacIsaac	
Caroline Mallonee
Ingram Marshall	
Ira Mowitz	
Amy X Neuburg
Russell Platt	 
Eric Segnitz	
Bright Sheng
Roberto Sierra	
Sigmund Snopek III	
Carl Stone
Michael Torke	
Lois V. Vierk	  
Qu Xiao-Song

Recognition

Adventurous programming awards 

Present Music is a six-time recipient of the American Society of Composers, Authors and Publishers Adventurous Programming Award. Among the six awards are:
First Prize in Adventurous Programming, Self-Presenting Ensemble for the 2002–2003 season.
Second Prize in Adventurous Programming, Self-Presenting Chamber Ensemble - New Music, for the 2003-2004 Season.
First Prize in Adventurous Programming for Small Presenter - Contemporary for the 2009–2010 season.

Wisconsin Area Music Industry Awards 

The Present Music Ensemble has been the recipient of the Wisconsin Area Music Industry Award in the Classical Group category. Some of the years in which Present Music was the winner of this award are 2002, 2004, and 2008.

References

External links 
 Southeastern Wisconsin Arts Guild Article   
 Shepherd Express Article

Organizations established in 1982
Music organizations based in the United States
Organizations based in Milwaukee
1982 establishments in Wisconsin